Tavaragera is located in the northeast part of Koppal district, Karnataka, India. It is 24 km away from Kushtagi taluk and 90 km away from Koppal.
It is famous for its rayana Kere(pond or lake) built by vijayanagara kings in 15th CE  that is why the  name taware(lotus) kere(pond)= tawargere derived. 

Many kings ruled this town 
Namely nizams , vijayanagara kings and so on.

References

See also
Koppal
Kushtagi

Villages in Koppal district